Shimmering Icefield is an icefield between the Shipton and Tilman Ridges in the Allan Hills, Oates Land in East Antarctica. It was reconnoitered in 1964 by the New Zealand Antarctic Research Programme's  Allan Hills Expedition, who gave the name because of its frequently nacreous luster when viewed against the sun.

References

Glaciers of Oates Land